Paul Dennis O'Neill (born 17 June 1982) is an English footballer who played in The Football League for Macclesfield Town. He made his professional debut towards the end of the 1999–2000 season. He moved to playing league football in Wales in 2004. Signed for non league club Chorley in 2013

References

External links

English footballers
Macclesfield Town F.C. players
English Football League players
1982 births
Living people
Association football defenders
Footballers from Bolton
Gretna F.C. players
Scottish Football League players
Bangor City F.C. players
Rhyl F.C. players
Prestatyn Town F.C. players
Chorley F.C. players
Cymru Premier players